John Alfred Green (15 October 1867 – 12 March 1922) was a British educationalist, professor of education at Sheffield University.

References 

British educational theorists
Academics of the University of Sheffield
1867 births
1922 deaths